Söllner is a German surname most prevalent in northern Bavaria.
It originates as a term for a social class in feudal times; a Söllner was a free farmer who did own a farmstead but no land (either leasing land or working for a landowner).

Notable people called Söllner include:
 Karl Söllner (1903-1986), German-Austrian chemist
 Paul Söllner (1911–1991), German rower
 Siegfried Söllner (born 1936), German football player
 Werner Söllner (1951–2019), German writer
 Hans Söllner (born 1955), Bavarian singer-songwriter

German-language surnames